Chloroclystis elaiachroma is a moth in the family Geometridae. It is found in Bolivia and Brazil.

References

Moths described in 1908
Chloroclystis
Moths of South America